The Kidnappers (US: The Little Kidnappers) is a 1953 British film, directed by Philip Leacock and written by Neil Paterson.

Plot 

In the early 1900s, two young orphaned brothers, eight-year-old Harry (Jon Whiteley) and five-year-old Davy Mackenzie (Vincent Winter) are sent to live in a Scottish settlement in Nova Scotia, Canada, with their stern Grandfather (Duncan Macrae) and Grandmother (Jean Anderson) after their father's death in the Boer War. The boys would love to have a dog but are not allowed, Grandaddy holding that "ye canna eat a dog". Then they find an abandoned baby. Living in fear of Grandaddy (he beats Harry, the older boy, for disobeying him), they conceal it from the adults.  They view the baby as a kind of substitute for the dog that they have been denied (Davy, the younger boy, asks his brother, "Shall we call the baby Rover, Harry?").

Grandaddy is having problems with the Dutch settlers who have arrived at the settlement in increasing numbers after leaving South Africa at the end of the Boer War. He has had a long-running dispute with Afrikaner Jan Hooft (Francis de Wolff) over ownership of a hill and refuses to accept a legal ruling that the land, in fact, belongs to Hooft. He also keeps a close rein on his grown-up daughter Kirsty (Adrienne Corri) and is reluctant for her to make a life for herself. She is in love with the local doctor Willem Bloem (Theodore Bikel), who left Holland for Canada for reasons he will not disclose. He does not return her affections.

To make matters worse, it turns out that the "kidnapped" baby is Hooft's younger daughter. When found out, Harry is tried at a court set up in the local trading store. He is suspected of taking the baby as a result of the tensions between the two families but states that he did not know her identity. Surprisingly, Hooft speaks up in his defense, stating that no harm had come to her and his older daughter should have been looking after her. The court official suggests that Harry be sent to a corrective school, and is immediately threatened with shooting by Grandaddy. The clerk climbs down, merely suggesting an investigation into the location of these schools in case a further kidnapping should occur. Afterwards, Grandaddy thanks Hooft for speaking up for Harry.

The film ends with Grandaddy (who had never learned to read or write) instructing Harry to write to a mail order company to order the red setter they had set their hearts on. He had found the flyer for the dog in one of his best boots, where the boys had hidden it. They had noticed that he sometimes walked without these boots, slinging them over his shoulder, to save wear and tear. To pay for the dog, Grandaddy had sold them – a prized item among his few possessions. Davy is now able to say, "I think we'll call him Rover, Harry."

One of the film's most memorable moments comes with the horror on Duncan Macrae's face at what his grandson must have thought of him when the little boy implores "Don't eat the babbie, grandaddy!".

Cast 

 Duncan Macrae as Jim MacKenzie
 Jean Anderson as Grandma MacKenzie
 Adrienne Corri as Kirsty
 Theodore Bikel as Dr. Willem Bloem
 Jon Whiteley as Harry, Jim's grandson
 Vincent Winter as Davy, another grandson
 Francis de Wolff as Jan Hooft Sr.
 James Sutherland as Arron McNab
 John Rae as Andrew McCleod  
 Jack Stewart as Dominie  
 Jameson Clark as Tom Cameron  
 Eric Woodburn as Sam Howie  
 Christopher Beeny as Jan Hooft Jr.

Reception 

The film was based on Neil Paterson's short story "Scotch Settlement", and was the eighth most popular movie at the British box office in 1954. According to Kinematograph Weekly the film was a "money maker" at the British box office in 1954.

Both Whiteley and Winter were presented with Honorary Juvenile Acting Oscars for their performances, which had been coached by director Margaret Thomson. In addition, the film was nominated for three BAFTA Film Awards and was entered into the 1954 Cannes Film Festival.

A second film based on the same Patterson short story was released in 1990, under the original film's American title (The Little Kidnappers).  Starring Charlton Heston in the role of Granddaddy, the film was written by Coralee Elliott Testar and shot entirely on location in Nova Scotia.

References

External links 

 
 
 

1953 drama films
1953 films
British black-and-white films
Films about orphans
Films set in Nova Scotia
Films shot at Pinewood Studios
British drama films
Films based on short fiction
Films directed by Philip Leacock
1950s English-language films
1950s British films